Glockenspiel may refer to:

Culture

Musical instruments 

 Glockenspiel, a set of tuned metal bars
 Keyboard glockenspiel, a glockenspiel operated by a keyboard mechanism
 Carillon, an instrument consisting of at least 23 cast bronze cup-shaped bells

Music 

 "Das Glockenspiel", a single from the Schiller debut album, Zeitgeist

Games 

 Bunnock, a game commonly referred to as glockenspiel

Places 

 Glockenspiel House, a building in Bremen, Germany named after its carillon
 Rathaus-Glockenspiel, a clock in Marienplatz, Munich, Germany

Other uses 

 Glockenspiel, an Irish software company acquired by CA Technologies in 1992